Oakley Street may refer to:
Oakley Street, Chelsea, London
Baylis Road, Lambeth, London; previously called Oakley Street